Farajabad (also Romanized as Farajābād; also known as Farajābād-e Aḩmadlū) is a village in Rudshur Rural District, in the Central District of Zarandieh County, Markazi Province, Iran. At the 2006 census, its population was 97, in 28 families.

References 

Populated places in Zarandieh County